Parliamentary elections were held in Germany took place on 12 November 1933. They were the first since the Nazi Party seized complete power with the passage of the Enabling Act in March. All opposition parties had been banned by the Law Against the Formation of Parties (14 July 1933), and voters were presented with a single list containing Nazis and 22 non-party "guests" (Gäste) of the Nazi Party. These "guests", who included the likes of Alfred Hugenberg, still fully supported the regime of Adolf Hitler in any event.

This election set the tone for all further elections and referendums held in the Nazi era. Official results showed 92 percent of the voters approved the Nazi list, on a turnout of 96 percent. The vote was held in far-from secret circumstances; many voters feared that anyone who voted "no" would be detected and punished for doing so. In some communities, voters were threatened with reprisals if they dared to vote no, or even if they simply failed to vote at all. Nonetheless, 3.3 million voters submitted 'invalid' ballots.

These elections were held on the same day as a separate referendum on Hitler's decision to pull Germany out of the League of Nations, which passed with similar numbers. The new Reichstag, exclusively composed of NSDAP members and sympathisers, convened on 12 December to elect a Presidium headed by President of the Reichstag Hermann Göring.

Results

References

Further reading

Germany 2
Parliamentary
1933 11
1933 11
Germany
One-party elections
Single-candidate elections